Autumn Sonata (Höstsonaten) is an opera in two acts by composer Sebastian Fagerlund, with a Swedish libretto by  based on the screenplay for the 1978 film of the same name by Ingmar Bergman.

The opera was commissioned by the Finnish National Opera and premiered on 8 September 2017, directed by Stéphane Braunschweig and conducted by John Storgårds. Three of the performances of the premiere production where recorded by BIS for a live recording that was released in September 2018. In Autumn 2017 the opera was also streamed in HD on the OperaVision platform in collaboration with the Finnish Broadcasting Company.

On 27 of October 2018 the Finnish National Opera and the premiere production cast performed a concertante version of Autumn Sonata at the Baltic Sea Festival in the Berwald Hallen in Stockholm, Sweden. The performance was conducted by Dalia Stasevska. The Swedish premiere on 13 September 2019 was conducted by Patrik Ringborg. On 18 October 2019, Malmö Opera brought the revived production to Hong Kong World Cultures festival for three performances between 18 and 20 October 2019. The premiere production of Autumn Sonata was revived at the Finnish National Opera between 15 November and 12 December 2019. The original cast was the same, except the role of Eva, sung by Ingela Brimberg.

Autumn Sonata is published by Edition Peters.

Roles

Reception 

Guy Dammann gave a 5 star review in the Financial Times: "Striking, Superb!"

Camilla Lundberg in the Swedish newspaper Dagens Nyheter wrote: "A new opera has rarely struck so deeply" [Sällan har en opera träffat så djupt].

Göran Forsling wrote in Seen and Heard International: "Sebastian Fagerlund has created a colorful score that powerfully comments, underlines and punctuates the text. The music is not melodious, but it is expressive and full of feeling."

Reviewer Martin Lim wrote in the South China Morning Post: "Opera Autumn Sonata, adapted from the original Swedish film, is an explosion of musical color ...".

Andrew Mellor reviewed the CD recording of Autumn Sonata in Gramophone: "Fagerlund's brooding, tension-ridden score is excellent at differentiating between Charlotte (her music all uppity and precious) and Eva (lost in a sea of loneliness and emotional damage) and grinding those elements together to deliver the opera's sucker punches."

References 

2017 operas
Swedish-language operas
Operas set in Sweden
Operas set in the 20th century
Operas based on films
Operas
Compositions by Sebastian Fagerlund
Adaptations of works by Ingmar Bergman